Cañas River may refer to:

 Cañas River (Mexico)
 Cañas River (Bebedero River tributary), in Costa Rica and Nicaragua
 Cañas River (Juana Diaz, Puerto Rico)
 Cañas River (Mayagüez, Puerto Rico)
 Cañas River (Naranjito, Puerto Rico)
 Cañas River (Ponce, Puerto Rico)
 Cañas River (Sabana Grande, Puerto Rico)
 Cañas River (Tempisque River tributary)

See also 
 Canas (disambiguation)
 Canoas River (disambiguation)
 Río Cañas (disambiguation)